Dorcadion abulense is a species of beetle in the family Cerambycidae. It was described by Lauffer in 1902. It is known from Spain.

Subspecies
 Dorcadion abulense abulense Lauffer, 1902
 Dorcadion abulense granulipenne Escalera, 1908

See also 
Dorcadion

References

abulense
Beetles described in 1902